A Russian village and the center of the local village council located 9 km to the east of the district center, which has a bus service, on both sides of the Sukhoy Lipljan creek ravine (in 1795 called 'Mokhov'). 2004 census record 195 households with 464 inhabitants. Built on the road from Narovchatov to Spassk.

Name
The name's origin is undetermined. It is supposedly a corruption of Tatar's word 'Adashe', based on the fact that in the second half of the 15th century, the lands on which the future village of Abashevo will be built was owned by Tatar prince Adashev. The alternative version refers to the documents from the 16-18 century referencing a Mordovian male named 'Adash'.

History
The village is first mentioned in the 1658-61 scribe books of Shatsky County as the patrimony of the landlord I.K. Shepilov. In 1681 the peasants of Abashevo rebelled against the landowner; to subdue and punish peasants with Batogs the squadron of archers and gunners was sent from Shatsk. Multiple reported peasant revolts that were suppressed with the help of the soldiers are also recorded in 1842 and 1843 respectively.

1795

Narovchat county, area of the village is 74 tithes, 180 peasant households belonging to landowners: Prince Yakov Alexandrovich Golitsyn. Alexey Danilovich Durnovo and Ivan Vasilievich Yavorsky, there was a wooden church of St. Nicholas. Records indicated that peasants worked on the serfdom. 

One of the notable owners of the Abashevo was Durnovo family. Durnovo was a noble family of the same origin with Tolstoy. One of Tolstoy's was nicknamed Durnoy [could be translated as evil, the bad, joker]. Durnovos participated in the assentation to the throne of Tsar Mikhail Fedorovich Romanov. Durnovos landed in various provinces, including Penza. After the death of Colonel Alexey Danilovich Durnovo land was owned by his cousin Nikolay Dmitrievich Durnovo (1725-1816), the general-in-chief, Senator, Commander of the Order of St. Alexander Nevsky and St. Vladimir of 1 degree. He served in the prestigious Semenov Life Guards regiment. In 1765 he was sent on a special mission into the small town of Yaitsky where he was severely beaten by rebellious Cossacks. On recovery, he was transferred into the supply division with the rank of a brigadier. By 1783 he has risen to the rank of lieutenant-general, and in 8 years he was managing the military commissariat department and obtained the title of 'senator' while becoming a member of the Military Collegium. Under his ownership Abashevo was 887 people strong. From Nikolay Dmitrievich Durnovo land passed to Alexei Mikhailovich Durnovo, grandson Alexei Danilovich Durnovo, who have eventually sold the village to Second-Major Sergey Andreevich Arapov (1765-1837).

1800s
The village is owned by Second Major Sergey Andreevich Arapov. 

 In 1837 the wooden church of St. Nicholas was rebuilt. 
 In 1838 Arapov brought the estate staff captain Platon Ivanovich Pukalov to manage the estate.
 By 1840 Arapov transferred the management of Abashevo to his proxy Lieutenant Michael Andrianovich Lachinov. 
 In 1877 parish center of Narovchat district counted 218 households, about half of the residents were Old Believers Beglopopovtsy.
 In 1883 a new St. Nicholas Church built.
 By 1892 the single-faith community was formed.

1900s
Abashevo is one of the centers of pottery in the Penza province. I the year of 1902 from a total number of 264 households 200 of them recorded as pottery makers. Since the mid-19th century in addition to utilitarian pottery, Abashevo began the production of clay toys and whistles that received wide acclaim. During the 1958 excavation on the southern outskirts of the village 20 graves of ancient Mordovians-Moksha were discovered.

Population

Notes and references

Abashevo
House of Durnovo